A kenesa (Karaim: כְּנִיסָא kǝnîsāʾ) is an Eastern European or Persian Karaite synagogue.

Kenesas are similar to Rabbinical synagogues. In Eastern Europe, they are laid out along north-south axis (facing Jerusalem). Starting from the northern entrance, a kenesa contains:
 Vestibule (azar), where worshipers take off their shoes. Shoes are not permitted anywhere further.
 Moshav Zeqenim (old men's pews): wooden benches for the old and the mourners, usually under a low ceiling. The loft above this ceiling is reserved for the women, who remain invisible to the men on the main floor.
 Shulḥan ( "table"): the main hall. Traditional Karaite worship was performed on the knees. In the past, kenesa floors were carpeted; modern kenesas have pews in the main hall.
 Hekhal, or altar: raised stand for the ritual Ark and the priest.

Some kenesas also have a rood screen.

Etymology 
The word derives from Arabic كنيسة "church" or كنيس "synagogue" (ultimately from the Semitic root k-n-s in the sense of "to assemble") and is first found in Karaim and Karaite Hebrew texts from the late nineteenth century. Before this, and commonly after, Karaites used the standard Jewish terms בית הכנסת and synagogue. In Galicia, the word was often shortened to kensa as early as 1903.

In Russian it is usually pronounced кенасá (kenasá) with an ultimate stress. Some claim it has a Persian or Aramaic origin.

Surviving kenesas
There were 20 kenesas in the former Russian Empire, nine of them in Crimea (by 1918, two more were added). All surviving kenesas are listed memorial buildings, however, many are in a dilapidated state, and others, like Sebastopol kenesa, although in better shape, are managed by public authorities or private owners, not the Karaite communities. The principal, operating place of Karaite worship in Ukraine is located in Yevpatoria, Crimea. It actually contains two independent kenesas, re-opened to the public in 2005 and 1999.

Karaite synagogues in Lithuania were built in the 14th century, in Trakai, Biržai, Kėdainiai, Panevėžys and Vilnius. An early 20th-century kenesa still stands in Trakai, Lithuania and another one in Vilnius; both are in service. No Karaite synagogues survived in Galicia, where Karaites were present since the 13th century; the last kenesa in Halych was destroyed by the Soviets in 1985. Only the Karaite Synagogue in Istanbul survives in Turkey.

Gallery

References 

 Album "Karaite kenassas in Eupatoria and other kenassas of the world", ed. by V. V. Mireyev, Simpferopol, 2006 = Альбом "Комплекс караимских кенасс в Евпатории и другие кенассы в мире", ред. В. В. Миpеев, Cимферополь, 2006

Synagogues
Karaite Judaism
Religious buildings and structures in Lithuania
Religious buildings and structures in Ukraine
Karaite synagogues